Chris Lawler (born 8 February 1971) is an Australian former professional rugby league footballer who played in the 1990s.  He played for the Parramatta Eels, and the Gold Coast Chargers. He mostly played at Five-Eighth, but also played at halfback or on the wing.

Lawler made his debut for Parramatta in round 2 of the 1994 season against the Balmain Tigers.  In 1998, Lawler moved to the Gold Coast Chargers and played two games for the club before retiring at the end of the season.

References

1971 births
Living people
Australian rugby league players
Parramatta Eels players
Rugby league wingers
Gold Coast Chargers players
Place of birth missing (living people)